This Is My Father is a 1998 film directed by Paul Quinn.

Plot
The film portrays a tragic love story set in late 1930s Ireland, focusing on the relationship between Fiona Flynn (Moya Farrelly), a beautiful, feisty seventeen-year-old from a middle-class family, and Kieran O'Dea (Aidan Quinn), a shy labourer in his early thirties, and the search decades later by their son, Kieran Johnson, (James Caan) to find his roots in late 1990s Ireland.

The film is told as an interweaving of the nineties setting, where Kieran is hearing the story of his parents, and the events of the 1930s. Kieran Johnson grew into adulthood unaware of his parents' story or of the tragic events that caused his mother to leave Ireland on her own while pregnant.

The story highlights the issues of prejudice, classism, alcoholism and social and religious conservatism in rural 1930s Ireland.

Cast
Main cast
 Aidan Quinn as Kieran O'Dea
 James Caan as Kieran Johnson
 Moya Farrelly as Fiona Flynn
 Jacob Tierney as Jack
 Gina Moxley as Widow Flynn

Supporting Cast
 Colm Meaney as Seamus (Bed and Breakfast Owner)
 Moira Deady as Mrs. Kearney
 John Cusack as Eddie Sharp (Pilot)
 Brendan Gleeson as Garda Jim
 Pat Shortt as Garda Ben
 Maria McDermottroe as Mrs. Maney
 Donal Donnelly as John Maney
 Eamon Morrissey as Father Mooney
 Stephen Rea as Mission Priest
 John Kavanagh as Liam Finneran 
 Karen Ardiff as Young Mrs. Kearney
 Sheila Flitton as Mrs. Madigan
 Pauline Hutton as Maria
 Fiona Glascott as Nuala

Reception
Roger Ebert given the film 3 out of 4 stars and compared it to his own visit to Ireland in 1967.

References

External links

1998 films
Canadian romantic drama films
Irish romantic drama films
English-language Canadian films
English-language Irish films
1998 romantic drama films
1990s English-language films
1990s Canadian films